A neutral country is a state that is neutral towards belligerents in a specific war or holds itself as permanently neutral in all future conflicts (including avoiding entering into military alliances such as NATO, CSTO or the SCO). As a type of non-combatant status, nationals of neutral countries enjoy protection under the law of war from belligerent actions to a greater extent than other non-combatants such as enemy civilians and prisoners of war. Different countries interpret their neutrality differently: some, such as Costa Rica, have demilitarized, while Switzerland holds to "armed neutrality", to deter aggression with a sizeable military, while barring itself from foreign deployment.

Not all neutral countries avoid any foreign deployment or alliances, as Austria and Ireland have active UN peacekeeping forces and a political alliance within the European Union. Sweden's traditional policy was not to participate in military alliances, with the intention of staying neutral in the case of war. Immediately before World War II, the Nordic countries stated their neutrality, but Sweden changed its position to that of non-belligerent at the start of the Winter War. Sweden would uphold its policy of neutrality until the 2022 Russian invasion of Ukraine. During the Cold War, Yugoslavia claimed military and ideological neutrality from both the Western and Eastern Bloc, becoming a co-founder of the Non-Aligned Movement.

There have been considerable changes to the interpretation of neutral conduct over the past centuries.

Terminology 
 A neutral country in a particular war, is a sovereign state which refrains from joining either side of the conflict and adheres to the principle of the Law of Neutrality under international law. Although countries have historically often declared themselves as neutral at the outbreak of war, there is no obligation for them to do so. The rights and duties of a neutral power are defined in Sections 5 and 13 of the Hague Convention of 1907.
 A permanently neutral power is a sovereign state which is bound by international treaty, or by its own declaration, to be neutral towards the belligerents of all future wars. An example of a permanently neutral power is Switzerland. The concept of neutrality in war is narrowly defined and puts specific constraints on the neutral party in return for the internationally recognized right to remain neutral.
 Neutralism or a "neutralist policy" is a foreign policy position wherein a state intends to remain neutral in future wars. A sovereign state that reserves the right to become a belligerent if attacked by a party to the war is in a condition of armed neutrality.
 A non-belligerent state is one that indirectly participates in a war by politically or materially helping one side of the conflict and thus not participating militarily. For example, it may allow its territory to be used for the war effort. Contrary to neutrality, this term is not defined under international law.

Rights and responsibilities of a neutral power 
Belligerents may not invade neutral territory, and a neutral power's resisting any such attempt does not compromise its neutrality.

A neutral power must intern belligerent troops who reach its territory, but not escaped prisoners of war. Belligerent armies may not recruit neutral citizens, but they may go abroad to enlist. Belligerent armies' personnel and materiel may not be transported across neutral territory, but the wounded may be. A neutral power may supply communication facilities to belligerents, but not war materiel, although it need not prevent export of such materiel.

Belligerent naval vessels may use neutral ports for a maximum of 24 hours, though neutrals may impose different restrictions. Exceptions are to make repairs—only the minimum necessary to put back to sea—or if an opposing belligerent's vessel is already in port, in which case it must have a 24-hour head start. A prize ship captured by a belligerent in the territorial waters of a neutral power must be surrendered by the belligerent to the neutral, which must intern its crew.

Recognition and codification
Neutrality has been recognised in different ways, and sometimes involves a formal guarantor. For example, Austria has its neutrality guaranteed by its four former occupying powers, Switzerland by the signatories of the Congress of Vienna and Finland by the Soviet Union during the Cold War. The form of recognition varies, often by bilateral treaty (Finland), multilateral treaty (Austria) or a UN declaration (Turkmenistan). These treaties can in some ways be forced on a country (Austria's neutrality was insisted upon by the Soviet Union) but in other cases it is an active policy of the country concerned to respond to a geopolitical situation (Ireland in the Second World War).

For the country concerned, the policy is usually codified beyond the treaty itself. Austria and Japan codify their neutrality in their constitutions, but they do so with different levels of detail. Some details of neutrality are left to be interpreted by the government while others are explicitly stated, for example Austria may not host any foreign bases and Japan cannot participate in foreign wars. Yet Sweden, lacking formal codification, was more flexible during the Second World War in allowing troops to pass through its territory.

Armed neutrality

Armed neutrality is the posture of a state or group of states that has no alliance with either side of a war but asserts that it will defend itself against resulting incursions from any party. This may include:
Military preparedness without commitment, especially as the expressed policy of a neutral nation in wartime, and the readiness to counter with force an invasion of rights by any belligerent power.
Armed neutrality is a term used in international politics for the attitude of a state or group of states that makes no alliance with either side in a war. It is the condition of a neutral power during a war to hold itself ready to resist by force, any aggression of either belligerent.
Armed neutrality makes a seemingly-neutral state take up arms for protection to maintain its neutrality.

The term derives from the historic maritime neutrality of the First League of Armed Neutrality of the Nordic countries and Russia under the leadership of Catherine the Great, which was invented in the late 18th century but has since been used only to refer to countries' neutralities. Sweden and Switzerland are independently of each other famed for their armed neutralities, which they maintained throughout both World War I and World War II. The Swiss and the Swedes each have a long history of neutrality: they have not been in a state of war internationally since 1815 and 1814, respectively. Switzerland continues to pursue, however, an active foreign policy and is frequently involved in peace-building processes around the world. According to Edwin Reischauer, "To be neutral you must be ready to be highly militarized, like Switzerland or Sweden."

In contrast, other neutral states may abandon military power (examples of states doing this include Costa Rica and Liechtenstein) or reduce it, but rather uses it for the express purpose of home defense and the maintenance of its neutrality. But the lack of a military does not result in neutrality as countries such as Iceland replaced a standing military with a military guarantee from a stronger power.

Leagues of Armed Neutrality 
The First League of Armed Neutrality was an alliance of minor naval powers organized in 1780 by Catherine II of Russia to protect neutral shipping during the American Revolutionary War. The establishment of the First League of Armed Neutrality was viewed by Americans as a mark of Russian friendship and sympathy. This league had a lasting impact of Russian-American relations and the relations of those two powers and Britain. It was also the basis for international maritime law, which is still in effect. In the field of political science, this is the first historical example of armed neutrality, however, scholars like Dr. Carl Kulsrud argue that the concept of armed neutrality was introduced even earlier. Within 90 years before the First League of Armed Neutrality was established, neutral powers had joined forces no less than three times. As early as 1613, Lubeck and Holland joined powers to continue their maritime exploration without the commitment of being involved in wartime struggles on the sea.
The Second League of Armed Neutrality was an effort to revive this during the French Revolutionary Wars. It was an alliance with Denmark-Norway, Prussia, Sweden and Russia. It occurred during 1800 and 1801. The idea of this second league was to protect neutral shipping from the British Royal Navy. However, Britain took this as the alliance taking up sides with France, and  attacked Denmark leading to the Battle of Copenhagen (1801) and the taking of Copenhagen by the British. The alliance was forced to withdraw from the league.
A potential Third League of Armed Neutrality was discussed during the American Civil War, but was never realized.

Peacekeeping

For many states, such as Ireland, neutrality does not mean the absence of any foreign interventionism. Peacekeeping missions for the United Nations are seen as intertwined with it. The Swiss electorate rejected a 1994 proposal to join UN peacekeeping operations. Despite this, 23 Swiss observers and police have been deployed around the world in UN projects.

Points of debate
The legitimacy of whether some states are as neutral as they claim has been questioned in some circles, although this depends largely on a state's interpretation of its form of neutrality.

European Union
There are three members of the European Union that still describe themselves as a neutral country in some form: Austria, Ireland, and Malta. With the development of the EU's Common Security and Defence Policy, the extent to which they are, or should be, neutral is debated. For example, former Finnish Prime Minister, Matti Vanhanen, on 5 July 2006, stated that Finland was no longer neutral:
"Mr Pflüger described Finland as neutral. I must correct him on that: Finland is a member of the EU. We were at one time a politically neutral country, during the time of the Iron Curtain. Now we are a member of the Union, part of this community of values, which has a common policy and, moreover, a common foreign policy."

However, Finnish Prime Minister Juha Sipilä on 5 December 2017 still described the country as "militarily non-aligned" and that it should remain so. Ireland, which sought guarantees for its neutrality in EU treaties, argues that its neutrality does not mean that Ireland should avoid engagement in international affairs such as peacekeeping operations.

Since the enactment of the Lisbon Treaty, EU members are bound by TEU, Article 42.7, which obliges states to assist a fellow member that is the victim of armed aggression. It accords
"an obligation of aid and assistance by all the means in [other member states'] power" but would "not prejudice the specific character of the security and defense policy of certain Member States" (neutral policies), allowing members to respond with non-military aid. Ireland's constitution prohibits participating in such a common defence.

With the launch of Permanent Structured Cooperation (PESCO) in defense at the end of 2017, the EU's activity on military matters has increased. The policy was designed to be inclusive and allows states to opt in or out of specific forms of military cooperation. That has allowed most of the neutral states to participate, but opinions still vary. Some members of the Irish Parliament considered Ireland's joining PESCO as an abandonment of neutrality. It was passed with the government arguing that its opt-in nature allowed Ireland to "join elements of PESCO that were beneficial such as counter-terrorism, cybersecurity and peacekeeping... what we are not going to be doing is buying aircraft carriers and fighter jets". Malta, as of December 2017, is the only neutral state not to participate in PESCO. The Maltese government argued that it was going to wait and see how PESCO develops to see whether it would compromise Maltese neutrality.

Neutrality during World War II 

Many countries made neutrality declarations during World War II.  However, of the European states closest to the war, only Andorra, Ireland, Portugal, Spain, Sweden, Switzerland (with Liechtenstein), and Vatican (the Holy See) remained neutral to the end.

Their fulfillment to the letter of the rules of neutrality has been questioned: Ireland supplied important secret information to the Allies; for instance, the date of D-Day was decided on the basis of incoming Atlantic weather information, some of it supplied by Ireland but kept from Germany. Ireland also secretly allowed Allied aircraft to use the Donegal Corridor, making it possible for British planes to attack German U-boats in the mid-Atlantic. On the other hand, both Axis and Allied pilots who crash landed in Ireland were interned.

Sweden and Switzerland, surrounded by possessions and allies of Nazi Germany similarly made concessions to Nazi requests as well as to Allied requests.  Sweden was also involved in intelligence operations with the Allies, including listening stations in Sweden and espionage in Germany.  Spain offered to join the war on the side of Nazi Germany in 1940, allowed Axis ships and submarines to use its ports, imported war materials for Germany, and sent a Spanish volunteer combat division to aid the Nazi war effort.  Portugal officially stayed neutral, but actively supported both the Allies by providing overseas naval bases, and Germany by selling tungsten.

The United States was initially neutral and bound by the Neutrality Acts of 1936 not to sell war materials to belligerents.  Once war broke out, US President Franklin Delano Roosevelt persuaded Congress to replace the act with the Cash and carry program that allowed the US to provide military aid to the allies, despite opposition from non-interventionist members. The "Cash and carry" program was replaced in March 1941 by Lend-Lease, effectively ending the US pretense of neutrality.

Sweden also made concessions to the German Reich during the war to maintain its neutrality, the biggest concession was to let the 163rd German Infantry Division to be transferred from Norway to Finland by Swedish trains, to aid the Finns in the Continuation War.  The decision caused a political "Midsummer Crisis" of 1941, about Sweden's neutrality.

Equally, Vatican City made various diplomatic concessions to the Axis and Allied powers alike, while still keeping to the rules of the law of neutrality. The Holy See has been criticized—but largely exonerated later—for its silence on moral issues of the war.

List of neutral countries 
Some countries may occasionally claim to be "neutral" but not comply with the internationally agreed upon definition of neutrality as listed above.

List of formerly neutral countries

See also
 Buffer state
 Dual loyalty
 International humanitarian law
 Neutral powers during World War II
 Non-belligerent
 Non-interventionism
 Policy of deliberate ambiguity
 Strategic autonomy
 Neutral and Non-Aligned European States

References

Bibliography
Bemis, Samuel. "The United States and the Abortive Armed Neutrality of 1794. In "The American Historical Review, Vol. 24, No. 1 (October, 1918), pp. 26-47
Bienstock, Gregory. The Struggle for the Pacific. Alcester, Warwickshire, U.K.: READ BOOKS, 2007. 
Bissell, Richard E. and Gasteyger, Curt Walter. The Missing link: West European Neutrals and Regional Security. Durham, N.C.: Duke University Press, 1990. 
Fenwick, Charles. "The Status of Armed Neutrality." The American Political Science Review, Vol. 11, No. 2 (May, 1917), pp. 388–389
Hayes, Carlton. "Armed Neutrality with a Purpose." In "The Advocate of Peace." Vol. 79, No. 3 (March, 1917), pp. 74–77
Jones, Howard. Crucible of Power: A History of American Foreign Relations to 1913. 2d ed. New York: Rowman & Littlefield, 2009. 
Karsh, Efraim. Neutrality and Small States. Florence, Ky.: Routledge, 1988. 
Kulsrud, Carl J. "Armed Neutrality to 1870." The American Journal of International Law. Vol. 29, No. 3 (July, 1935), pp. 423–447 
Lottaz, Pascal/Reginbogin, Herbert R. (eds.) Notions of Neutralities. Lanham (MD): Lexington Books, 2019. 
Murdoch, James C. and Sandler, Todd. "Swedish Military Expenditures and Armed Neutrality." In The Economics of Defence Spending: An International Survey. Keith Hartley and Todd Sandler, eds. Florence, Ky.: Routledge, 1990. 
O'Sullivan, Michael Joseph. Ireland and the Global Question. Syracuse, N.Y.: Syracuse University Press, 2006. 
Oppenheim, Lassa. International Law: War and Neutrality. London: Longmans, Green, 1906.
 Petropoulos, Jonathan,  "Co-Opting Nazi Germany: Neutrality in Europe During World War II." Dimensions 14.1 (2000): 13+. excerpt</ref> 
Scott, James Brown. The Armed Neutralities of 1780 and 1800: A Collection of Official Documents Preceded by the Views of Representative Publicists. New York: Oxford University Press, 1918.
Wills, Clair. That Neutral Island: A Cultural History of Ireland During the Second World War. Cambridge, Mass.: Harvard University Press, 2007. 
.

External links

 Declaration for the Purpose of establishing Similar Rules of Neutrality, with Annexes
 The British Government's note affirming its neutrlality in the French-Prussian War of 1871, and answering Prussian allegations of a hidden pro-French bias
 
 
 
 
 
 
 
 

International relations theory
Law of war
Non-interventionism
Military diplomacy